Versace is an Italian fashion label.

Versace may also refer to:

People
Alfredo Versace (born 1969), Italian professional bridge player
Allegra Versace (born 1986),  Italian heiress and socialite, daughter of Donatella Versace
Ariel Versace (born 1992), American drag queen
Dick Versace (1940–2022), American basketball coach and executive
Donatella Versace (born 1955), Italian fashion designer, sister of Gianni
Gianni Versace (1946–1997), Italian fashion designer, founder of Gianni Versace S.p.A.
Humbert Roque Versace (1937-1965), US Army captain, Medal of Honor recipient and POW during Vietnam War
Massimiliano Versace (born 1972), Italian computer scientist
Santo Versace (born 1944), president of Gianni Versace SpA, brother of Gianni

Other
Palazzo Versace Australia, a luxury hotel located on the Gold Coast, Queensland, Australia
Palazzo Versace Dubai,  a luxury hotel and resort under construction in Dubai, United Arab Emirates
"Versace" (song), performed by Migos

See also